The 44th National Hockey League All-Star Game was the last NHL All-Star Game to take place at the Montreal Forum on February 6, 1993. Before the start of the Game, there was a tribute to Mario Lemieux, who was in attendance but could not play due to his treatments for Hodgkin's Disease. The Tampa Bay Lightning sent their first representatives to an All-Star Game. Mike Gartner would take Mark Messier's place in the All-Star lineup and ended up becoming the fourth player in All-Star history to score four goals in one game, earning All-Star MVP honours. The final score was Wales Conference 16, Campbell Conference 6.

Super Skills Competition 
The Campbell Conference would win their first Skills Competition since the 1990 Skills Competition after going through a penalty shot tie-breaker. Ray Bourque matched his four hits on four shots in the Accuracy Shooting event, while Mike Gartner established a new record in the Fastest Skater event at 13.510 seconds. Al Iafrate won the Hardest Shot event slapping the puck at 105.2 mph, which held the record as Hardest Shot for 16 years until it was broken in 2009 by Zdeno Chara, who shot 105.4 mph, which he improved to 105.9 mph in 2011 and again to 108.8 mph in 2012.

Uniforms 
Following the use of throwback uniforms in the 1992 All-Star Game, the NHL reverted to the design introduced in 1989, with one change. The numerals were changed from orange on both jerseys to the reverse of the background color - black outlined in orange on white, and white outlined in orange on black. In addition, the Stanley Cup Centennial patch was worn on the upper left chest.

Individual Event winners 
 Fastest Skater - Mike Gartner, (New York Rangers) - 13.510 seconds
 Accuracy Shooting - Ray Bourque, (Boston Bruins) - 4 hits, 4 shots
 Hardest Shot - Al Iafrate, (Washington Capitals) - 105.2 mph
 Goaltenders Competition - Jon Casey, (Minnesota North Stars) - 5 GA, 30 shots

The Game

Summary

 Referee: Dan Marouelli
 Linesmen: Ryan Bozak, Kevin Collins

Rosters

Notes 

Casey won in a penalty shot tie-breaker with Mike Vernon and Ed Belfour, each of whom also had 5 GA in the Breakaway Relay and Rapid Fire events.
Brian Leetch was voted as a starter, but was not able to play due to injury.  His teammate Kevin Lowe was his replacement in the starting lineup.
Mario Lemieux was voted as a starter, but was not able to play due to treatments for Hodgkin's Disease. Rick Tocchet was his replacement in the starting lineup.
Mark Messier was selected to the All-Star Game, but did not play. Mike Gartner was named as his replacement.
Jeff Brown was selected to the All-Star Game, but did not play. Garth Butcher was named as his replacement.

The Game set several All-Star Game records:

Team records:
 Most goals, both teams, one game: 22 (has since been broken)
 Most goals, one team, one game: 16 - Wales Conference
 Most shots, both teams, one game: 90 - Wales 49, Campbell 41 (has since been broken)
 Most shots, one team, one game: 49 - Wales Conference (has since been broken)
 Fastest three goals, both teams: 1:08 - All by Wales Conference - Mike Gartner at 3:15 and 3:37 of the first period, Peter Bondra at 4:23
 Fastest four goals, both teams: 3:40 - Pierre Turgeon (Wales) at 15:51 of the third period, Teemu Selanne (Campbell) at 17:03, Pavel Bure (Campbell) at 18:44 and 19:31 (has since been broken)
 Fastest three goals, one team (See "Fastest three goals, both teams" above)

Individual records:
 Most goals, one game: 4 - Mike Gartner, Wales; Equalled mark set by Wayne Gretzky, Mario Lemieux, and Vincent Damphousse
 Most assists, one period: 4 - Adam Oates, Wales, first period
 Most points, one period: 4 - Mike Gartner, Wales (3G, 1A in first period), Adam Oates, Wales (4A in first period)

See also 
1992–93 NHL season

All-Star Game
National Hockey League All-Star Games
1990s in Montreal
1993 in Quebec
Ice hockey competitions in Montreal
February 1993 sports events in Canada